Jacob van Geuns (15 November 1872 – 12 November 1952) was a Dutch fencer. He competed in the individual épée event at the 1912 Summer Olympics.

References

External links
 

1872 births
1952 deaths
Dutch male épée fencers
Olympic fencers of the Netherlands
Fencers at the 1912 Summer Olympics
Sportspeople from Utrecht (city)
20th-century Dutch people